The 1935 Penn Quakers football team was an American football team that represented the University of Pennsylvania as an independent during the 1935 college football season. In its fifth season under head coach Harvey Harman, the team compiled a 4–4 record and outscored opponents by a total of 199 to 80. The team played its home games at Franklin Field in Philadelphia.

Schedule

References

Penn
Penn Quakers football seasons
Penn Quakers football